The 1992 Bucknell Bison football team was an American football team that represented Bucknell University during the 1992 NCAA Division I-AA football season. Bucknell tied for last in the Patriot League. 

In their fourth year under head coach Lou Maranzana, the Bison compiled a 7–4 record. David Berardinelli, John Lusk and Eric Rutter were the team captains.

The Bison were outscored 318 to 201. Their 1–4 conference record tied for fifth (and worst) in the six-team Patriot League standings. 

Bucknell played its home games at Christy Mathewson–Memorial Stadium on the university campus in Lewisburg, Pennsylvania.

Schedule

References

Bucknell
Bucknell Bison football seasons
Bucknell Bison football